Threapwood is a civil parish in Cheshire West and Chester, England. It contains three buildings that are recorded in the National Heritage List for England as designated listed buildings.  Of these, one is listed at Grade II*, the middle grade, and the other two are at Grade II.  Apart from the village of Threapwood, the parish is entirely rural.  The listed buildings consist of a church, its gates and walls, and a derelict windmill.

Key

Buildings

References
Citations

Sources

Listed buildings in Cheshire West and Chester
Lists of listed buildings in Cheshire